This is a list of places on the Victorian Heritage Register in the Shire of Moira in Victoria, Australia. The Victorian Heritage Register is maintained by the Heritage Council of Victoria.

The Victorian Heritage Register, as of 2021, lists the following eight state-registered places within the Shire of Moira:

References 

Moira
+
+